The 2013 Morocco Tennis Tour – Tanger was a professional tennis tournament played on clay courts. It was the fourth edition of the tournament and part of the 2013 ATP Challenger Tour. It took place in Tangier, Morocco between 17 and 22 June 2013.

Singles main draw entrants

Seeds

 1 Rankings are as of June 10, 2013.

Other entrants
The following players received wildcards into the singles main draw:
  Reda El Amrani
  Yassine Idmbarek
  Hicham Khaddari
  Younès Rachidi

The following players received entry from the qualifying draw:
  Lorenzo Giustino
  Tristan Lamasine
  Lamine Ouahab
  Sherif Sabry

The following player received entry as lucky loser:
  Isak Arvidsson

Doubles main draw entrants

Seeds

1 Rankings as of June 10, 2013.

Other entrants
The following pairs received wildcards into the doubles main draw:
  Ayoub Chekrouni /  Soufiani Sahli
  Reda El Amrani /  Lamine Ouahab
  Yassine Idmbarek /  Younès Rachidi

The following pair received entry as an alternate:
  Sherif Sabry /  Mohamed Safwat

Champions

Singles

 Pablo Carreño Busta def.  Mikhail Kukushkin, 6–2, 4–1 ret

Doubles

 Nikola Ćirić /  Goran Tošić def.  Maximilian Neuchrist /  Mate Pavić, 6–3, 6–7(5–7), [10–8]

External links
Official Website

Morocco Tennis Tour - Tanger
Morocco Tennis Tour – Tanger
2013 Morocco Tennis Tour